Halleck: Lincoln's Chief of Staff is the biography of Union Army General-in-Chief Henry Halleck written by Stephen E. Ambrose and published in 1962. In this book, Ambrose provides an interpretation contrary to previous assessments of this "controversial figure" from the American Civil War.

References

1962 non-fiction books
Books by Stephen Ambrose
American biographies